In enzymology, a dihydrouracil oxidase is an enzyme that catalyzes the chemical reaction

5,6-dihydrouracil + O2  uracil + H2O2

Thus, the two substrates of this enzyme are 5,6-dihydrouracil and O2, whereas its two products are uracil and H2O2.

This enzyme belongs to the family of oxidoreductases, specifically those acting on the CH-CH group of donor with oxygen as acceptor.  The systematic name of this enzyme class is 5,6-dihydrouracil:oxygen oxidoreductase. It employs one cofactor, FMN.

References

 

EC 1.3.3
Flavoproteins
Enzymes of unknown structure